"California Roll" is a song by American rapper Snoop Dogg, featuring vocals from fellow American musicians Stevie Wonder and Pharrell Williams, the latter of whom goes uncredited, but produced the song alongside Chad Hugo as The Neptunes. It was released on May 5, 2015 as the third and final single from Snoop Dogg's thirteenth studio album Bush (2015), with the record labels i am OTHER and Columbia Records. Williams is credited as a co-writer of the song, along with Snoop Dogg and James Fauntleroy. The song cover art features model Afiya Bennett.

Music video 
The official music video for the single was uploaded to VEVO May 5, 2015. It was directed by Warren Fu. In the video, a group of African Americans in 1940s Los Angeles, in a movie theater to see the (fictional) film California Roll: A Flight to the Future, find that the film is more like a ride, with seat belts required, and narrated by a talking robot. The film/ride shows a retrofuturistic Los Angeles, with flying vintage cars and Ancient Egyptian elements. (The film-within-a-film also includes brief product placement for the Sony Xperia Z3 phone.) One audience member, played by Nia Long, is surprised to see drawings of her within the film; she then ends up inside the film, alongside Snoop Dogg in the 1940s Buick-style flying car he is driving. At the end of the video, as the other audience members rise up to leave, it is clear that she has remained within the futuristic world.

The video's concept was a collaborative effort: it was Fu's idea to show a ride through LA, Williams' idea to have it set in an Egyptian-style future, and Snoop Dogg's to have the audience be from the 1940s.

Commercial performance 
The single debuted at number 49 on the US R&B/Hip-Hop Songs chart, becoming Snoop's 70th entry on the chart.

Track listing 
Download digital
California Roll (featuring Stevie Wonder) — 4:12

Chart performance

Weekly charts

Release history

References

2015 singles
Snoop Dogg songs
Stevie Wonder songs
Pharrell Williams songs
Songs written by Snoop Dogg
Songs written by Pharrell Williams
Song recordings produced by the Neptunes
Columbia Records singles
2015 songs
Songs written by James Fauntleroy
Music videos directed by Warren Fu